Pushpavananathar Temple is a Hindu temple dedicated to Shiva located in the village of Tiruppoonturutti near Tiruvaiyaru, Tamil Nadu, India. Shiva is worshiped as Aiyarappar, and is represented by the lingam and his consort Parvati is depicted as Soundaranayagi. The presiding deity is revered in the 7th century Tamil Saiva canonical work, the Tevaram, written by Tamil poet saints known as the nayanars and classified as Paadal Petra Sthalam.

There are many inscriptions associated with the temple indicating contributions from Cholas, Thanjavur Nayaks and Thanjavur Maratha kingdom. The oldest parts of the present masonry structure were built during the Chola dynasty in the 9th century, while later expansions, including the towering gopuram gatehouses, are attributed to later periods, up to the Thanjavur Nayaks during the 16th century.

The temple has numerous shrines, with those of Pushpavananathar and Soundaranayagi being the most prominent. The temple complex houses many halls and three precincts; the most notable is the second precinct built during the Vijayanagar period that has many sculptures. The temple has four daily rituals at various times from 6:30 a.m. to 8 p.m., and twelve yearly festivals on its calendar. The temple is maintained and administered by Hindu Religious and Charitable Endowments Department of the Government of Tamil Nadu.

Thiruvalampozhil Shiva Temple, another Padal petra sthalm is located nearby in the same village.

Legend

The temple is believed to be the place where Thirunavukkarasar (also called Appar), the Saivite saint from the 7th century is believed to have performed extensive weeding work in the temple. The temple is also the place where the other Saivite saint Sambandar is believed to have stopped at the entrance and the Nandi moved a little to allow him the view of the sanctum. The place is also believed to be the place where Appar shouldered the palanquin of Sambandar. As per Hindu legend, Indra was cursed by sage Gautama to have thousand moles in his body to make him ugly for his bad desires. Indra was passing through many places for relief, but when he reached the place, he started performing worship with flowers (called poo in Tamil). The presiding deity thus came to be known as Pushpavananthar. As per the regional view, a holy place lying between two rivers is called Thurthi. It is one such place, with the other Thuruthi located near Mayiladuthurai

Architecture
The temple is located 5 km south-west of Tiruvaiyaru on the Thanjavur Tiruvayyaru road. The temple has a five-tiered rajagopuram the gateway tower. The Panchamurthi mandapa is found in the first precinct and the Vasantha Mandapa is found in the second entrance. The first precinct has paintings of the life of sage Appar. There are various unique sculptures in the temple like Appar in seated posture, Panruti Katava Nambi and Durga standing in one leg to atone the killing of Mahishasura. The central shrine houses the image of Pushpavananthar in the form of Lingam facing east. Unlike other temples, where the Nandi is located axial to and facing the sanctum, in this temple the Nandi is located slightly out of axis. The central shrine is approached through the flagstaff and Mahamandapam, both which are located axial to the gateway. The shrine of Valambigai, the consort of Shiva facing West is located in the Mahamandapam leading to the sanctum. As in other Shiva temples in Tamil Nadu, the shrines of Vinayaka, Murugan, Navagraha, Chandikesa and Durga are located around the precinct of the main shrine. There is a hall of Nataraja near the sanctum. In modern times, the temple is maintained and administered by the Hindu Religious and Charitable Endowments Department of the Government of Tamil Nadu.

Saptha Stanam

The sapthasthanam festival is conducted at Tiruvaiyaru during April every year. As per Hindu legend, it is the wedding festival of Nandikeswara, the sacred bull of Shiva on the Punarpoosa star during the Tamil month of Panguni. The festival deity of Aiyarappar temple of Thiruvaiyaru is carried in a decorated glass palanquin along with the images of Nandikeswara and Suyasayambikai to the temples in Thirupazhanam, Thiruchottruthurai, Thiruvedhikudi, Thirukandiyur and Thirupoonthurthi. Each of the festival deities of the respective temples mounted in glass palanquins accompany Aiyarppar on the way to the final destiny, Thillaistanam. There is a grand display of fireworks in Cauvery riverbed outside Thillaistanam temple. The seven palanquins are carried to Aiyarappar temple in Thiruvaiyyaru. Hundreds of people witness the convergence of seven glass palanquins carrying principal deities of respective temples from seven places at Tiruvaiyaru. The devotees perform Poochorithal(flower festival) in which a doll offers flowers to the principal deities in the palanquins. After the Poochorithal, the palanquins leave for their respective temples.

Religious imporanct and worship practices

The temple is one of the shrines of the 275 Paadal Petra Sthalams – Shiva Sthalams glorified in the early medieval Tevaram poems by Tamil Saivite Nayanars Sundarar. The temple houses the samadhi of Sanakar, the disciple of Dakshinamoorthy in front of the image of Shiva. The temple is also the place where Sivananda Mouna Guru Swamigal was doing penance. As the temple is revered in Tevaram, it is classified as Paadal Petra Sthalam, one of the 275 temples that find mention in the Saiva canon. The temple is counted as the 242nd in the list of 276 temples. The temple is counted as one of the temples built on the banks of River Kaveri. Narayana Teertha  (c. 1650 – 1745 CE) has composed many songs on the presiding deity.

The temple priests perform the puja (rituals) during festivals and on a daily basis. Like other Shiva temples of Tamil Nadu, the priests belong to the Shaiva community, a Brahmin sub-caste. The temple rituals are performed five times a day; Ushathkalam at 6:30 a.m., Kalasanthi at 8:00 a.m., Uchikalam at 12:00 a.m., Sayarakshai at 5:00 p.m., and Ardha Jamam at 8:00 p.m. Each ritual comprises four steps: abhisheka (sacred bath), alangaram (decoration), naivethanam (food offering) and deepa aradanai (waving of lamps) for both Pushpavananthar and Soundaranayagi. The worship is held amidst music with nagaswaram (pipe instrument) and tavil (percussion instrument), religious instructions in the Vedas (sacred texts) read by priests and prostration by worshipers in front of the temple mast. Mahashivaratri during February – March is the major festivals celebrated in the temple. The major festival in the region and the temple is the Sapthastanam festival. Paarivettai is another major festival celebrated in the temple.

Notes

References

External links

 
Shiva temples in Thanjavur district